Days of Kaunas City is an annual series of cultural events to celebrate the anniversary of Kaunas, Lithuania. The festivities mark May 20, 1463, when Grand Duke Casimir IV Jagiellon renewed and expanded the privileges of the city in 1463. The oldest original privilege is kept in Saint Petersburg archives and its copy is kept in the Town Hall of Kaunas. The main events of the festival, including folk art fairs and concerts, take place in the streets and squares of the Old Town of Kaunas at the end of May.

External links
 Official website of Kaunas municipality
 Official website of Kaunas City days in 2009

Cultural festivals in Lithuania
Events in Kaunas
Culture in Kaunas
Annual events in Lithuania